Kenneth Wayne Sims (born October 31, 1959) is a former American college and professional football player who was a defensive end in the National Football League (NFL) for eight seasons during the 1980s. He played college football at Texas, where he was a two-time consensus All-American. Sims was the first overall pick in the 1982 NFL Draft, and played professionally for the New England Patriots of the NFL.

Early years
Sims was born in Kosse, Texas. In his junior year at Groesbeck High School, Sims quit football but then realized that football was indeed for him and went on to spend his senior year playing linebacker, fullback and tight end, rather than as a tackle.

College career
At Texas, Sims spent his freshman year learning the basics of the tackle position. He spent his sophomore year behind Steve McMichael and Bill Acker, then became a force his junior year. He made 131 tackles, and was named an All-American. As a senior in 1981, Sims became the first Longhorn to win the Lombardi Trophy, was named the 1981 UPI Lineman of the Year and earned All-America status once again.

Professional career
With the Patriots in the NFL, Sims played 74 career games and had 17 sacks over eight NFL seasons. His best year was 1985, when he managed 5.5 sacks and played in Super Bowl XX.

See also
List of Texas Longhorns football All-Americans
List of New England Patriots first-round draft picks

References

1959 births
Living people
American football defensive ends
New England Patriots players
Texas Longhorns football players
All-American college football players
National Football League first-overall draft picks
People from Kosse, Texas
Players of American football from Texas
Ed Block Courage Award recipients